John Jankila is an American curler.

At the national level, he is a 1980 United States men's curling champion.

Teams

References

External links
 
 
 

Living people
American male curlers
American curling champions
Year of birth missing (living people)
Place of birth missing (living people)